Helge Lunde Seip (5 March 1919 – 29 January 2004) was a Norwegian politician for the Liberal Party and later the Liberal People's Party.

He was born in Surnadal. At a young age he became involved in the Young Liberals, the youth wing of the Liberal Party. In the local chapter of Oslo he was a member of the board from 1937 to 1939, and deputy chairman from 1939 to 1945. From 1945 to 1947 he was a board member of their national organization. In 1948 he became a deputy member of the Liberal Party national board, advancing to regular board member in 1952. He continued in this position, becoming national party leader in 1970.

He was elected to the Parliament of Norway from Oslo in 1953, and was re-elected on three occasions in 1957, 1965 and 1969. In between he headed the Liberal ballot in the 1961 election, but the Liberals had no MPs elected. In 1965 he was appointed Minister of Local Government in the centre-right Borten's Cabinet. He left in 1970, and was replaced by Helge Rognlien.

During his fifth term as parliament member, in December 1972, Seip joined the Liberal People's Party which split from the Liberal Party over disagreements of Norway's proposed entry to the European Economic Community. He was again succeeded by Helge Rognlien, this time as party leader of the Liberal Party. Instead, Seip became the first leader of the Liberal People's Party. However, Seip was not re-elected to parliament in 1973, thus disappearing from national politics.

On the local level Seip was a member of Oslo city council from 1945 to 1947, and later of Bærum municipal council from 1951 to 1967, serving as deputy mayor from 1951 to 1955, and later another tenure from 1979 to 1991.

Outside politics, Seip graduated from the University of Oslo as cand.oecon. in 1941 and cand.jur. in 1942. Among his jobs before becoming a cabinet member were consultant in the Ministry of Finance from 1946 to 1948, lecturer at the University of Oslo from 1947 to 1955, assistant secretary in the Ministry of Trade from 1948 to 1952, the same position at Statistics Norway from 1952 to 1954 and political chief editor in the newspaper Dagbladet from 1954 to 1965. In 1951 the idea of appointing Seip as a State Secretary in the Ministry of Finance was discussed, but it did not happen.

He was secretary general of the Nordic Council from 1973 to 1977, and editor-in-chief of Norges Handels- og Sjøfartstidende (renamed Dagens Næringsliv in 1987) from 1977 to 1980. In 1980 he was appointed director of the newly created Norwegian Data Inspectorate. He left in 1989 to become Data Protection Commissioner for the Council of Europe, a position he held until his retirement in 1995.

His brother Martin Fredrik Seip was a noted physician and professor of medicine.

References

1919 births
2004 deaths
Liberal Party (Norway) politicians
Liberal People's Party (Norway, 1972) politicians
Members of the Storting
Ministers of Local Government and Modernisation of Norway
Politicians from Oslo
Bærum politicians
Norwegian newspaper editors
University of Oslo alumni
Academic staff of the University of Oslo
Norwegian writers
Directors of government agencies of Norway
Helge
20th-century Norwegian politicians
People from Surnadal